Michael Grunstein (born 1946, in Romania) is a Distinguished Professor Emeritus of Biological Chemistry at the David Geffen School of Medicine at UCLA.

The only surviving child of Holocaust survivors, he obtained his Bachelor of Science degree from McGill University in Montreal, and his PhD from the University of Edinburgh, Scotland. He did his post-doctoral training at Stanford University in Palo Alto, California, where he invented the colony hybridization screening technique for recombinant DNAs in David Hogness' laboratory.

After coming to UCLA in 1975, Grunstein pioneered the genetic analysis of histones in yeast and showed for the first time that histones are regulators of gene activity in living cells., confirming the previous demonstration of the regulation of transcription by histones in vitro  His laboratory's studies provided inspiration for the eukaryotic histone code and underlie the modern study of epigenetics.  His work, which "catapulted the field forward", was recognized in 2018 with the Albert Lasker Award for Basic Medical Research.

Honors and awards
2003 Massry Prize from the Keck School of Medicine, University of Southern California (with Roger Kornberg and C. David Allis). 
 April 2008, Grunstein was elected into the National Academy of Sciences.
2011 Lewis S. Rosenstiel Award for Distinguished Work in Basic Medical Research (shared with C. David Allis)
2016 Gruber Prize in Genetics from The Gruber Foundation (at Yale University) (jointly with C. David Allis)
2018 Albert Lasker Award for Basic Medical Research (jointly with C. David Allis)
2022 Albany Medical Center Prize (jointly with C. David Allis)

See also
List of members of the National Academy of sciences

References

External links
 Grunstein Lab
 Michael Grunstein profile at the University of California, Los Angeles

1946 births
Living people
21st-century American biologists
McGill University alumni
Alumni of the University of Edinburgh
David Geffen School of Medicine at UCLA faculty
Members of the United States National Academy of Sciences
American people of Romanian-Jewish descent
Romanian emigrants to the United States
Massry Prize recipients
Recipients of the Albert Lasker Award for Basic Medical Research